The Marietta and Friedrich Torberg Medal (until 2002 named Friedrich Torberg Medal) is an award given by the Vienna Israelite Community. It is awarded to personalities and initiatives campaigning against antisemitism, racism, and Nazism.

Recipients

 1987
 

 1990
 Siegfried Reingruber and Hermann Reitmajer

 1995
 Students and teachers of Gymnasium Friesgasse

 1997
 

 1999
 Primavera Gruber, Hans Litsauer, Werner Rotter, Karin Schön, Georg Schönfeld
 

 2000
 Hubertus Czernin
 
 

 2001
 
 
 
 

 2002
 Terezija Stoisits
 Ludwig Adamovich Jr.
 Wolfgang Petritsch

 2003
 Ute Bock
 
 

 2005
 Waltraud Klasnic
 Clemens Jabloner
 

 2007
 
 Ida Olga Höfler
 Gerhard Roth

 2008
Georg Haber

 2010
 Lena, Franziska und Franz Müllner
 Martina Enzmann
 

 2011
 Thomas Haffner
 

 2012
 Helmut Nausner
 Clemens Hellsberg
 
 Andreas Maislinger
 Hannes Porias

 2013
 Christian Kern

 2015
 Karel Schwarzenberg

 2016

References

External links 
http://www.ots.at/presseaussendung/OTS_20120521_OTS0018/verleihung-der-marietta-und-friedrich-torberg-medaille-2012

See also
Austrian Service Abroad
Austrian Holocaust Memorial Service

Braunau am Inn
Austrian awards
Holocaust commemoration
Anti-racism in Austria
Anti-fascism in Austria
Opposition to antisemitism in Austria